Year 1226 (MCCXXVI) was a common year starting on Thursday (link will display the full calendar) of the Julian calendar.

Events 
 By place 

 Europe 
 June – King Louis VIII (the Lion) leads a Crusade against the Carthars (Albigensians) and Raymond VII, count of Toulouse. The Crusaders capture the cities of Béziers, Carcassonne, Beaucaire and Marseille. Louis forces Languedoc into submission, and reasserts his authority upon the autonomous municipalities of his estates. Most cities have to accept the authority of Ramon Berenguer IV, count of Provence, but Marseille and Nice rebel.
 Siege of Avignon: Crusader forces under Louis VIII besiege Avignon. They dig trenches facing the city walls – which are connected on both sides of the Rhône with pontoon bridges. On August 8, Louis launches an assault led by Count Guy II of Saint-Pol, but the attackers are repulsed. After negotiations, the consuls agree to pay an indemnity of 6,000 marks. On September 9, the gates are opened and Louis enters the city without violence.
 November 8 – Louis VIII dies of dysentery at Château de Montpensier during his return from the Albigensian Crusade. He is succeeded by his 12-year-old son Louis IX (the Saint), who becomes king of France. His mother, Queen Blanche of Castile, rules the kingdom as regent during his minority. She has Louis crowned at Reims Cathedral on November 29, and forces the rebellious southern French nobles to swear allegiance to him.
 The Teutonic Knights undertake a new Crusade, attempting to subdue the pagan Prussians, who occupy a part of the Baltic coast. They are invited to Poland by High Duke Konrad I, a grandson of Bolesław III (Wrymouth). Their task is to defend Masovia against raids of the Prussians. After defeating them, the German knights set up their own state, which they named after the pagan people they have all but annihilated – Prussia.
 King Sancho II (the Pious) launches an offensive against the Almohad Caliphate during the Reconquista, and takes the city of Elvas.
 Rǫgnvaldr Guðrøðarson is overthrown as ruler of the Kingdom of the Isles, and is replaced by his half-brother, Olaf the Black.

 Mongol Empire 
 Summer – Genghis Khan starts a campaign against the Tanguts, punishing the vassal kingdom of Western Xia (or Xi Xia) for not contributing to the Mongol invasions. He assembles a large force (some 100,000 men), and lays siege to Liangzhou, second-largest city in Western Xia, which surrenders without resistance. In the autumn, Genghis crosses the Helan Mountains, and in November he lays siege to Lingwu. Meanwhile, Emperor Xian Zong dies and is succeeded by his nephew Mo (or Li Xian).

 Middle East 
 March 9 – Khwarezmian forces under Sultan Jalal al-Din Mangburni capture Tbilisi, capital of the Kingdom of Georgia, killing many of its Christian inhabitants. 

 Asia 
 October 30 – Trần Thủ Độ, head of the Trần dynasty of Vietnam, forces Lý Huệ Tông, last emperor of the Lý dynasty, to commit suicide.

 By topic 

 Art and Culture 
 Brother Robert writes the Old Norse Saga Af Tristram ok Ísodd, one of the rare fully surviving versions of the legend of Tristan and Iseult.

 Astronomy 
 March 4 – Just before dawn, a great conjunction between Saturn and Jupiter occurs.

 Religion 
 March 26 – Emperor Frederick II issues the Golden Bull of Rimini, in which he grants Teutonic Knights the right to all of the lands they will get during the mission in Prussia; he also considers himself a senior of the Teutonic Order and Poland, as well as the universal ruler of Christian Europe.
 September 11 – The Catholic Church practice of eucharistic adoration among lay people formally begins in Avignon, Provence.
 The Carmelite Order is approved by Pope Honorius III in the bull Ut vivendi normam.

Births 
 April 16 – Mugaku Sogen, Chinese monk and adviser (d. 1286)
 June 21 – Bolesłaus V (the Chaste), Polish nobleman (d. 1279)
 November 2 – Isabella de Clare, English noblewoman (d. 1264)
 Amato Ronconi, Italian nobleman, monk and hermit (d. 1292)
 Angelo da Foligno (or Conti), Italian cleric and priest (d. 1312)
 Ata-Malik Juvayni, Persian governor and historian (d. 1283)
 Bai Renfu (or Bai Pu), Chinese poet and playwright (d. 1306)
 Bar Hebraeus, Syrian scholar, historian and bishop (d. 1286)
 Blanche of Navarre (or Champagne), duchess of Brittany (d. 1283)
 Charles I, French nobleman and son of Louis VIII (d. 1285)
 Dietrich VI, German nobleman and knight (d. 1275)
 Gertrude of Austria, Austrian noblewoman (d. 1288)
 Herman VI, German nobleman and knight (d. 1250)
 Maria of Brabant, German noblewoman (d. 1256)
 Ulrich I (the Founder), German nobleman (d. 1265)

Deaths 
 March 7 – William Longespée, English nobleman and knight (b. 1176) 
 May 2 – Amaury I de Craon, French nobleman and knight (b. 1170)
 May 10 – Beatrice d'Este, Italian Benedictine nun and saint (b. 1192)
 June 5 – Henry Borwin II (or Burwy), German nobleman (b. 1170)
 July 2 – Waleran III (or Walram), duke of Limburg (b. 1165)
 July 11 – Al-Zahir, caliph of the Abbasid Caliphate (b. 1175)
 August 8 – Guy II of Saint Pol, French nobleman and knight
 September 9 – Rudolf von Güttingen, Swiss abbot and bishop 
 September 16 – Pandulf Verraccio, Italian bishop and politician
 October 3 – Francis of Assisi, founder of the Franciscan Order
 October 7 – Louis IV (the Young), French nobleman (b. 1173)
 October 22 – Renaud II (or de Forez), French archbishop
 November 8 – Louis VIII (the Lion), king of France (b. 1187)
 November 15 – Frederick of Isenberg, German nobleman
 December 18 – Benedict of Sausetun, bishop of Rochester 
 Aed mac Donn Ó Sochlachain, Irish musician and writer
 Bernart Arnaut d'Armagnac (or Arnaud), French troubadour
 Eleanor of Aragon, Spanish princess and countess (b. 1182)
 Falkes de Bréauté, Norman nobleman and High Sheriff
 Joseph ben Judah of Ceuta, Spanish physician and poet
 Roger de Montbegon, English nobleman and landowner
 Shen Zong, Chinese emperor of Western Xia (b. 1163)
 William Brewer, English nobleman and High Sheriff
 Xian Zong, Chinese emperor of Western Xia (b. 1181)

References